Eric W. Sanderson is a landscape ecologist for the Wildlife Conservation Society at the Bronx Zoo, director of the Mannahatta Project and the author of Mannahatta: A Natural History of New York City. In 2013 Sanderson's book Terra Nova: The New World After Oil, Cars, and Suburbs was published.

Sanderson earned his B.A.S. and Ph.D. in ecology from the University of California, Davis.  He is a Senior Conservation Ecologist at the Wildlife Conservation Society (WCS) where he has worked since 1998. As part of his work at the WCS, Sanderson is the chief author, researcher, and director of the Mannahatta Project.

See also
Sanderson, Eric W. and Markley Boyer (Illustrator) (2009). Mannahatta: A Natural History of New York City Abrams Books.  
Wilks, Barbara, Eric W. Sanderson, and Michael Sorkin (2013). Structuring Confluence: The Work of W Architecture & Landscape Architecture. ORO Editions.

References

External links
The Welikia Project
Wildlife Conservation Society
TED: New York - before the city

American ecologists
Environmental historians
University of California, Davis alumni
Living people
Year of birth missing (living people)